Ananthagiri is a thesildar in Kodad revenue division in the Suryapet district of Telangana, South India. Ananthagiri is also called has Hanumantha-Giri and later on people spell it has ananthagiri. Because, all say that there are more than 100 Lord Hanuman vigrahas around and nearby villages. The language spoken here is Telugu. It was the biggest Gram panchayat in Ananthagiri Mandal. It is a Village with great natural resources and high population density. NH-65 is the nearest highway which passes through the nearest town Kodad which is located at a distance of 7 km from Kodad.

Demographics 
 census of India, Ananthagiri Village has total 3632 families residing. Ananthagiri village has population of 13738 of which 6940 are males while 6798 are females as per Population Census 2011.

Ananthagiri village population of children with age 0-6 is 1458 which makes up 10.61% of total population of village. The literacy rate of the village is 61.06%.  In Ananthagiri Male literacy stands at 71.92% while female literacy rate was 50.09%.

Schedule Tribe (ST) constitutes 23.29% while Schedule Caste (SC) were 22.07% of total population in Anantha Giri village.

mining 
As per telangana state rules and regulations and this place is very very famous by stone suppliers.

Education
It is the major educational destination in the region. There is 1 engineering college named Anurag Group of Institutions located 1 km near this village and 2 Government schools in Ananthagiri.

Engineering College in Ananthagri 
click the details to see about Anurag Engineering College

http://anurag.ac.in/

Politics
Parliamentary Constituency- Nalgonda

Member of Parliament- N Uttham Kumar Reddy.
The current MLA of Kodad is Bollam mallaiah yadav. The current Sarpanch of Ananthagiri is Venepally Venkateshwara Rao.

Places of worship
 Sri Sitha Rama Swamy Temple
 Shivalayam Temple
 Hanuman Temple
 Laxmi Narasimha Swamy Temple

Weather and Climate
It is too Hot in summer. Highest day temperature is in between 35 °C to 48 °C . Average temperatures of January is 24 °C, February is 26 °C, March is 29 °C, April is 33 °C, May is 36 °C .

References 

Villages in Suryapet district
Mandal headquarters in Suryapet district